Alexandros Vouxinos (born 23 November 1919) was a Greek alpine skier. He competed at the 1952 Winter Olympics and the 1956 Winter Olympics.

References

External links
 

1919 births
Possibly living people
Greek male alpine skiers
Olympic alpine skiers of Greece
Alpine skiers at the 1952 Winter Olympics
Alpine skiers at the 1956 Winter Olympics
Place of birth missing